Marie Louis Henri Descorches (17 September 1749 – 1830) was a French diplomat.

Born into French nobility (marquis d`Escorches de Sainte Croix) he enlisted in the French Army, reaching the rank of a colonel in 1780. He renounced his title, adopted the name Descorches and became a vivid supporter of the French revolution. He was French representative in Poland (1791–1792) and Ottoman Empire (1793–1795). He was prefect of Drôme from 1800 to 1815.

1749 births
1830 deaths
18th-century French diplomats